Alvik is a locality situated in Luleå Municipality, Norrbotten County, Sweden with 777 inhabitants in 2010.

Sports
The following sports clubs are located in Alvik:

 Alviks IK

References 

Populated places in Luleå Municipality
Norrbotten